Institute of Health Technology, Rajshahi or I.H.T Rajshahi  is one of the government medical institutes in Rajshahi, Bangladesh. In 1976, it started with only 75 students.

History
In 1976, a paramedical institute was established in Laxmipur district of Rajshahi for people of Rajshahi. It was established at the three Faculty (Pharmacy, Lab-medicine and Radiography) . Gradually increased the number of faculty. It has nearly 1050 students currently studying in 7 faculties. At first its name was "paramedical". From 12 July 1989 the institute changed the name. Students are admitted to the BSc course from 2009 to 2010 when the course was started. BSc courses in two faculties (BSc in Medical Technology Laboratory and BSc in physiotherapy) started functioning with 60 students.

Buildings

Laboratory
In Institute of Health Technology, Rajshahi, All departments have a different laboratory. According to the department work is to be performed in a variety of experiments.

Library
Institute of Health Technology, Rajshahi have an enriched library.

Publications
At I.H.T Rajshahi, Anniversary & the popular periodicals are published regularly. All the students and teachers at the institute can write.

Courses

Diploma 
 Diploma in Dentistry
 Diploma in Laboratory Medicine
 Diploma in Pharmacy
 Diploma in Physiotherapy
 Diploma in Radiotherapy
 Diploma in Radiology & imaging 
 Diploma in Sanitary inspector ship training

BSc 
 BSc in Medical technology (Laboratory)
 BSc in Physiotherapy

References

 

Pharmacy schools
Educational institutions established in 1976
1976 establishments in Bangladesh